The UK Rock & Metal Singles Chart is a record chart which ranks the best-selling rock and heavy metal songs in the United Kingdom. Compiled and published by the Official Charts Company, the data is based on each track's weekly physical sales, digital downloads and streams. In 2008, there were ten singles that topped the 52 published charts. The first number-one single of the year was "Long Road to Ruin" by American alternative rock band Foo Fighters, which spent the last three weeks of 2007 and the first of 2008 atop the chart. The final number-one single of the year was "All Summer Long" by American country rock musician Kid Rock.

The most successful song on the UK Rock & Metal Singles Chart in 2008 was "Rockstar" by Canadian band Nickelback, which spent 23 weeks at number one during the year, including a single run of 20 consecutive weeks. The band spent a total of 29 weeks atop the chart in 2008, with "Photograph" and "Gotta Be Somebody" each spending three weeks at number one. Kid Rock's "All Summer Long" spent a total of 16 weeks at number one during the year, including separate runs of eight and seven consecutive weeks. Only one single – Enter Shikari's "We Can Breathe in Space, They Just Don't Want Us to Escape" – spent two weeks at number one.

Chart history

See also
2008 in British music
List of UK Rock & Metal Albums Chart number ones of 2008

References

External links
Official UK Rock & Metal Singles Chart Top 40 at the Official Charts Company
The Official UK Top 40 Rock Singles at BBC Radio 1

2008 in British music
United Kingdom Rock and Metal Singles
2008